Nalla Veedu is a 1956 Indian Tamil language film, directed by Jyotish Sinha. The film stars Sivaji Ganesan, M. N. Rajam, Pandaribai and Mynavathi.

Cast 
Sivaji Ganesan
M. N. Rajam
Pandaribai
Mynavathi
R. S. Manohar
T. S. Balaiah
K. A. Thangavelu

Soundtrack 
The music was composed by Krishnamurthi & Nagaraja Iyer. Lyrics were penned by M. P. Sivam, Thilagam and Lakshmanadas. Playback singers are P. B. Srinivas, A. M. Rajah, T. M. Soundararajan, T. V. Rathnam, R. Balasaraswathi Devi, A. Andal and Sarojini.

References

External links 
 

1956 films
1950s Tamil-language films